José Luis Ballester Tuliesa (born 17 August 1968) is a Spanish sailor and Olympic champion. He competed at the 1996 Summer Olympics in Atlanta and won a gold medal in the Tornado class.

Notes

References

External links
 
 
 
 

1968 births
Living people
Spanish male sailors (sport)
Olympic sailors of Spain
Olympic gold medalists for Spain
Olympic medalists in sailing
Sailors at the 1992 Summer Olympics – Tornado
Sailors at the 1996 Summer Olympics – Tornado
Sailors at the 2000 Summer Olympics – Tornado
Medalists at the 1996 Summer Olympics
Tornado class world champions
World champions in sailing for Spain
20th-century Spanish people